Kyrgyzstan Time (KGT)is the time zone of Kyrgyzstan. It is +6:00 hrs ahead of Universal Coordinated Time (UTC+06:00). Kyrgyzstan does not observe daylight saving time.

IANA time zone database
Data for Kyrgyzstan directly from zone.tab of the IANA time zone database. Columns marked with * are the columns from zone.tab itself.

History
Historic time zones for Kyrgyzstan (both as an independent country and as part of the Soviet Union)

References

Society of Kyrgyzstan
Time zones
Time in Asia